BXX may refer to:

 BXX (airport), an airport in Boorama, Somaliland 
 ISO 639:bxx, a spurious language